Janet is a hamlet in southern Alberta under the jurisdiction of Rocky View County. Janet is primarily an industrial area that is home to some transportation and logistics companies.

History 

Janet began as a siding and flag station built by the Canadian National Railway at which a station was erected in 1912. It is believed that the Harry Whittaker family was one of Janet's first settlers. The Columbia Grain Co. built an elevator in 1928 and rented it to Parrish & Heimbecker. It carried the Columbia name for many years thereafter. The precise name of Janet is unknown.

For a period of time in the mid-2000s, Janet was considered for annexation by the City of Calgary in its negotiations with Rocky View County. The hamlet remains within a Rocky View County industrial growth corridor, while lands north of Township Road 240 are within a joint planning area.

Demographics 
The population of Janet according to the 2006 municipal census conducted by Rocky View County is 1.

See also 
List of communities in Alberta
List of hamlets in Alberta

References 

Karamitsanis, Aphrodite (1992). Place Names of Alberta – Volume II, Southern Alberta, University of Calgary Press, Calgary, Alberta. 
Read, Tracey (1983). Acres and Empires – A History of the Municipal District of Rocky View, Calgary, Alberta.

Rocky View County
Hamlets in Alberta
Calgary Region